George C. Parker (March 16, 1860 – 1936) was an American con man best known for his repeated successes "selling" the Brooklyn Bridge. He made his living conducting illegal sales of property he did not own, often New York's public landmarks, to unwary immigrants. The Brooklyn Bridge was the subject of several of his transactions, predicated on the notion of the buyer controlling access to the bridge. Police removed several of his victims from the bridge as they tried to erect toll booths.

Early life
Parker was born in New York City to Irish parents. He had four brothers and three sisters,
and was a high school graduate.

Criminal career

Parker used various names as a con man, including James J. O'Brien, Warden Kennedy, Mr. Roberts and Mr. Taylor.

In addition to his Brooklyn Bridge scam, other public landmarks he incorporated into his scams included the original Madison Square Garden, the Metropolitan Museum of Art, Grant's Tomb and the Statue of Liberty. Parker had multiple methods for making his sales.  When he sold Grant's Tomb, he would often pose as the general's grandson, and he set up a fake office to handle his real estate swindles. He produced convincing forged documents as evidence to suggest that he was the legal owner of whatever property he was selling. He also sold several successful shows and plays, of which he had no legal ownership.

Parker was convicted of fraud three times. After one arrest, around 1908, he escaped the courthouse by calmly walking out after donning a sheriff's hat and coat that had been set down by a sheriff who had walked in from the cold outdoors. After his fourth conviction on December 17, 1928, he was sentenced to a mandatory life term at Sing Sing Prison by Judge Alonzo G. McLaughlin in the Kings County Court. He spent the last eight years of his life incarcerated there and was popular among guards and fellow inmates who enjoyed hearing of his exploits.  Parker is remembered as one of the most successful con men in the history of the United States, as well as one of history's most talented hoaxers.

In popular culture
Parker's exploits gave rise to phrases such as "and if you believe that, I have a bridge to sell you", to insinuate that someone is gullible.

"The Man Who Sold New York", a song about George C. Parker written by Boo Hewerdine and Findlay Napier, appears on Napier's 2013 album VIP: Very Interesting Persons.

See also
William McCloundy
Victor Lustig

References

American confidence tricksters
Criminals from New York City
1860 births
1936 deaths
American people convicted of fraud
American people of Irish descent
Inmates of Sing Sing